Stade André Moga is a sports stadium in Bègles, France. It hosts the home matches of Union Bordeaux Bègles, a rugby union team who play in the Top 14 competition. The Stadium is part of the Delphin Loche sporting complex which is composed of two playing fields and a Basque Pelota wall and court.

History
Built in the early 1920s on a field called Musard, the stadium is still unofficially called Musard Stadium. Officially named Andre Moga in honor of a former player and club president, the stadium holds up to 7000 seats but has a full capacity of 10,000 spectators.

See also

List of rugby league stadiums by capacity
List of rugby union stadiums by capacity

References

External links
 stadium-attendances.com
 wcities.com

Sports venues in Gironde
Rugby union stadiums in France
Sports venues completed in 1920